Reinado Internacional del Café 2004, was held in Manizales, Colombia, on January 10, 2004. 27 contestants attended the event. The winner was Daniela Scholz, from Germany.

Results

Special Awards
 Queen of the Journalists:  - Daniela Scholz
 Best Legs:  - Daniela Scholz
 Best Hair:  - Fabiana Dos Santos
 Best National Costume:  - Leslie Paredes Barahona

References

External links
 Instituto de Cultura y Turismo de Manizales
 Alcaldía de Manizales
 REINADO INTERNACIONAL DEL CAFE
http://www.bellezavenezolana.net/news/2004/Enero/20040111.htm

2004
2004 beauty pageants
2004 in Colombia